The Imperial Russian Historical Society (Russian - Императорское Русское историческое общество) was a public organization of Imperial Russia. It was subject to the jurisdiction of the Ministry of National Education. It was founded in 1866 and dissolved in 1917. It published studies on Russian history and historical documents connected with the Imperial Russian state. It is most notable as the publisher of the Russian Biographical Dictionary. Its emblem was an image of the Monument to Minin and Pozharsky.

History

19th century
It was founded in March 1866 by local and military historians and government officials, with its charter approved on 23 May 1866 by Alexander II of Russia and stating its purpose as being "to contribute fully to the development of education in Russian national history".  The Society received the highest approval of Alexander II and by his consent it promoted the development of civic education in Russia. On 24 November 1873 it was given the name the "Imperial Russian Historical Society."

20th century

21st century
In 2013, the Russian President Vladimir Putin charged the RHS to select the existing history textbooks of different publishers in order to build up a uniform teaching of the national history within all the Russian schools. Since the scholastic year 2014/2015, Russian teachers were forbidden to adopt history textbooks that hadn't pass the RHS preventive approval.

Revival

Members
There were three main levels of member - full, honorary and 'соревнователи' (sorevnovateli) - along with foreign honorary members and corresponding members. Any member had to have focussed on the history of the Russian state. The founder members included:
Pyotr Vyazemsky
Alexander Polovtsov
Konstantin Bestuzhev-Ryumin
Modest Iwanowitsch Bogdanowitsch
Dmitry Tolstoy

It was governed by a board, made up of a president, assistant president, three members, the secretary and the treasurer.

Business

List of presidents

References

Bibliography
 

Historiography of Russia
Historical societies
History of the Russian Empire
H